Top Chef is a competitive cooking show television format that originated with the American TV show Top Chef, which premiered in March 2006. Licensing of the format is handled by NBCUniversal Television Distribution.

International adaptations
Current, previous and upcoming versions of Top Chef include:

References 

Top Chef
Cooking competitions
Reality television series franchises